K-Swiss, Inc. is an American athletic shoe brand based in Downtown Los Angeles. It was founded in 1966 and is currently owned by Xtep.

History
K-Swiss was founded in 1966 in Los Angeles by Swiss brothers, Art and Ernie Brunner. They became interested in tennis after emigrating to the United States. They imported leather tennis shoes from the Swiss shoe manufacturer Kuenzli. K-Swiss is the pairing of "K" in Kuenzli and "Swiss".

K-Swiss purchased the majority stake of Australian brand Royal Elastics in 2001. It sold Royal Elastics to a management-led investment group in 2009, recording a gain of $1.4 million in the second quarter.

In January 2013, the company — which posted $195 million in losses between 2009 and 2012 — was sold to Korean firm E-Land World Limited for $170 million. The following May, E-Land named a new executive team to oversee the newly formed K-Swiss Inc., including Truman Kim as chairman and Larry Remington as president and CEO.

On June 1, 2015, K-Swiss acquired Supra Footwear. It moved its headquarters from Westlake Village to Downtown Los Angeles in 2016.

In August 2019, E-Land Footwear USA Holdings Inc. and consequently K-Swiss was acquired by Xtep International Holdings Limited.

Marketing
In the 1990s, Steven Nichols boosted K-Swiss's marketing budget, and hired a number of key individuals from large companies, such as Procter and Gamble. Award-winning Creative Director Mindy Gale led her NY based agency team in developing and producing K-Swiss advertising and publicity campaigns from 1997 until 2008. The "I Wear My K-Swiss" multi-media campaign ran for five consecutive years, targeting young urban consumers in print and on TV.

A re-branding campaign featuring Anna Kournikova rolled out in 2007. A 2011 advertisement, featuring Danny McBride as fictional character Kenny Powers, drew attention for its use of profanity.

In September 2014, the company unveiled a new marque. The new identity was created by a recently appointed internal creative team and plays up the company's heritage as an American tennis brand. All aspects of the new brand's design, including its 1966 typeface and tennis court colour palette, hark back to this identity. The company has been sponsoring events that appeal to their market as well as events which are likely to shape buying attitudes and help generate a positive reaction. One example is the sponsorship of Ireland's first sneaker convention run by Dub City Sneakz in Dún Laoghaire which K-Swiss sponsored.

In 2016, K-Swiss president Barney Waters made it the brand's mission to "make sneakers for entrepreneurs." The brand furthered this marketing angle by launching a collaboration with entrepreneur Gary Vaynerchuk in 2017. The company has since launched campaigns with other entrepreneurs, including Karen Civil, Ben Baller, and Natalie Ellis.

In 2019, K-Swiss debuted a shoe collaboration with TV series Breaking Bad.

Tennis sponsorships
 Cameron Norrie
 Yulia Putintseva
 Liudmila Samsonova
 Alison Riske-Amritraj
 Lauren Davis

References

External links

Kuenzli Schuhe (Swiss) History

American companies established in 1966
Clothing companies established in 1966
Manufacturing companies based in Greater Los Angeles
Companies based in Westlake Village, California
Sporting goods manufacturers of the United States
Athletic shoe brands
Shoe brands
Shoe companies of the United States
Sportswear brands
Companies formerly listed on the Nasdaq
1966 establishments in California
1990 initial public offerings
2013 mergers and acquisitions
American subsidiaries of foreign companies